The women's singles competition in luge at the 2022 Winter Olympics was held on 7 February (heats 1 and 2) and 8 February (heats 3 and 4), at the Xiaohaituo Bobsleigh and Luge Track in Yanqing District. The defending champion Natalie Geisenberger of Germany won the event and became thereby the first ever triple Olympic champion in women's luge. This is her fifth Olympic gold medal. Her compatriot Anna Berreiter won the silver medal, and Tatiana Ivanova, representing the Russian Olympic Committee, the bronze. This was the first Olympic medal for Berreiter and first individual medal for Ivanova, who already has the silver for the 2014 team relay.

In the 2021–22 Luge World Cup, Geisenberger was third, though she won the last race of the season before the Olympics. Julia Taubitz won the World Cup, with Madeleine Egle finishing second. The silver medalist at the 2018 Olympics, Dajana Eitberger, missed a season due to childbirth; she then returned to competitions, but finished outside of the top-10 in the World Cup and did not qualify for the Olympics. The 2018 bronze medalist, Alex Gough, retired from competitions.

Taubitz won the first run, setting the track record, but crashed in the second run, dropping out of the medal contention. Egle made a mistake in the first run, and after two runs was only seventh. This left Geisenberger in lead after two runs, with Anna Berreiter second and Tatiana Ivanova third. In the third run, Geisenberger set the new track record. Whereas Egle managed to fight back to the fourth position, the last run did not change the medal distribution.

Qualification

The qualification is based on the cumulative points of the Olympic Season from 1 July 2021 to January 10, 2022. A total of 35 quota spots are available to athletes to compete at the games. Each NOC can enter a maximum of three athletes.

In the women's singles, all nations with an athlete in the top 40 qualified one slot. If there were remaining spots left, the second best athlete of each nation in the top 32 was awarded an additional quota, with the third best being awarded a quota if there were any remaining spots.

On December 17, 2021, the International Luge Federation announced that the qualification system was changed. The qualification system was changed due to training runs being cancelled at the first World Cup, and equipment not being delivered to the following World Cups. The new system will see athletes qualify based on their top four results during the World Cup season, (as opposed to the previous all seven results counting).

On January 19, 2022 the International Luge Federation announced the list of qualified athletes.

Summary

Results

References

Luge at the 2022 Winter Olympics
Women's events at the 2022 Winter Olympics